Libertarian Party may refer to:

Liberal Libertarian Party
Libertarian Party of Australia
Libertarian Party of Canada
British Columbia Libertarian Party
Libertarian Party of Manitoba (now Freedom Party of Manitoba)
Ontario Libertarian Party
Libertarian Party (Netherlands)
Libertarian Party (Spain)
Libertarian Party of Russia
Libertarian Party (UK)
Scottish Libertarian Party
Libertarian Party (United States)
Libertarian Party of Alabama
Alaska Libertarian Party
Arizona Libertarian Party
Libertarian Party of Arkansas
Libertarian Party of California
Libertarian Party of Colorado
Libertarian Party of Connecticut
Libertarian Party of Delaware
Libertarian Party of the District of Columbia
Libertarian Party of Florida
Libertarian Party of Georgia
Libertarian Party of Hawaii
Libertarian Party of Idaho
Libertarian Party of Illinois
Libertarian Party of Indiana
Libertarian Party of Iowa
Libertarian Party of Kansas
Libertarian Party of Kentucky
Libertarian Party of Louisiana
Libertarian Party of Maine
Libertarian Party of Maryland
Libertarian Association of Massachusetts
Libertarian Party of Michigan
Libertarian Party of Minnesota
Libertarian Party of Mississippi
Libertarian Party of Missouri
Montana Libertarian Party
Libertarian Party of Nebraska
Libertarian Party of Nevada
Libertarian Party of New Hampshire
New Jersey Libertarian Party
Libertarian Party of New Mexico
Libertarian Party of New York
Libertarian Party of North Carolina
Libertarian Party of North Dakota
Libertarian Party of Ohio
Libertarian Party of Oklahoma
Libertarian Party of Oregon
Libertarian Party of Pennsylvania
Libertarian Party of Puerto Rico
Libertarian Party of Rhode Island
Libertarian Party of South Carolina
Libertarian Party of South Dakota
Libertarian Party of Tennessee
Libertarian Party of Texas
Libertarian Party of Utah
Libertarian Party of Vermont
Libertarian Party of Virginia
Libertarian Party of Washington
Libertarian Party of West Virginia
Libertarian Party of Wisconsin
Libertarian Party of Wyoming

See also
Libertarianism (disambiguation) 
List of libertarian political parties, for parties espousing some or all principles of libertarianism, but not necessarily using the word libertarian in their names